Rogério Dutra da Silva was the defending champion but chose to compete in Campeonato Internacional de Tenis de Santos instead.
Rubén Ramírez Hidalgo won the final against Alejandro González 6–4, 5–7, 7–6(7–4).

Seeds

Draw

Finals

Top half

Bottom half

References
 Main Draw
 Qualifying Draw

Visit Panama Cup - Singles
2013 Singles